Somnuek Nilkhieaw, known as Phraiwan Lukphet , was a Thai Luk thung singer.

Early life 
Phraiwan was born in December 14, 1941 in Phetchaburi Province. He started his career on stage thanks to his parents, who encouraged him to join the band called "Mueng Phet".

Career 
He later switched to the group Bangkok Cha Cha Cha.

When Bangkok Cha Cha Cha split up, Phraiwan worked with singer, Suraphol Sombatcharoen. Suraphol started composing music for Phraiwan, ultimately contributing to his success and popularity. Phraiwan's notable works include "Sam Ruay Luem Kham", "Nirat Rak Nakhornprathom", "Klin Toob Sukhothai" and "Nao Jai Thee Chai Daen".

Death
In 1985, while he was driving his car, he was shot. The bullet went through his neck, which resulted in a spinal fracture and paralysis. He continued to perform for years. He died on October 17, 2002.

References

1941 births
2002 deaths
Phraiwan Lukphet
Phraiwan Lukphet